Mount Clark may refer to:
Mount Clark (California)
Mount Clark (Washington), in the Olympic Mountains 
Mount Frederic Clark, a mountain in Canada

See also
Clark Mountain (disambiguation)
Clark Peak (disambiguation)
Mount Clarke